Android 1 could refer to:

 Android 1.0, the first version of the Android operating system
 Android One, a near-stock version of the Android operating system